Anolis chlorocyanus, the Tiburon green anole, is a species of anole endemic to Haiti, primarily the Tiburon Peninsula.

Taxonomy
It was formerly thought to have a much wider range across Hispaniola including the Dominican Republic, and to have been introduced to Florida and Suriname, but a 2020 study found the syntypes of A. chlorocyanus to be conspecific with the syntype of the former Anolis coelestinus, a Haitian endemic anole. Thus, both species were synonymized, and the widespread Hispaniolan population was described as a new species, the Dominican green anole (A. callainus). Due to this, A. chlorocyanus was restricted to only the population from Haiti.

See also
List of Anolis lizards

References

Anoles
Endemic fauna of Haiti
Lizards of the Caribbean
Reptiles of Haiti
Reptiles described in 1837
Taxa named by André Marie Constant Duméril
Taxa named by Gabriel Bibron